Hemisquilla ensigera is a species of mantis shrimp. Two formerly recognized subspecies are now considered to be separate species (H. californiensis, H. australiensis).

Ecology
The species is a near complete "oxyconformer" in that its aerobic metabolism is significantly depressed and impacted at low oxygen levels.

References

Stomatopoda

Crustaceans described in 1832